Arctic Cat is an American brand of snowmobiles and all-terrain vehicles manufactured in Thief River Falls, Minnesota. The company was formed in 1960 and is now part of Textron Inc. Arctic Cat designs, engineers, manufactures and markets all-terrain vehicles, snowmobiles, as well as related parts, garments—such as snowmobile suits—and accessories.

History
Arctic Cat was formed by snowmobile pioneer Edgar Hetteen in 1960 due to his departure from his previous self-started business, Polaris Industries. Like Polaris, Arctic Cat grew to become a major manufacturer of snowmobiles, watercraft, winter clothing, and all-terrain vehicles (ATV's). The company's first name was Polar Manufacturing but was soon changed to Arctic Enterprises. The company made their first snowmobile in 1960 and in 1970, started the Boss Cat line. In 1968 a 15,000 sqft winter wear factory was opened in Rainy River, Ontario employing an additional 60 workers. Various boat manufacturers, including Silver Line, Lund and Spirit Marine, were bought to attempt to expand the company. However, Arctic Cat went bankrupt in 1982. Two years later, a new company Arctco was created to continue the production of Arctic Cat snowmobiles. The company was successful in keeping the Arctic Cat alive and in 1996 the company changed its name to Arctic Cat. Over the years, the company has attempted many other product lines including snowblowers, generators, mini bikes, personal watercraft, helicopters, and two-wheel drive vehicles. Although the brand's headquarters has relocated several times in recent years, Arctic Cat continues the majority of its manufacturing, along with snowmobile engineering, in Thief River Falls, Minnesota. The company also manufactures engines at a facility in St. Cloud, Minnesota.

On January 25, 2017, it was announced Arctic Cat will be acquired by Textron in for $247M in a cash transaction. The all-terrain vehicle and side-by-side models branded as Arctic Cat were either discontinued or rebranded Textron, whereas the snowmobile models have kept the Arctic Cat brand. In early 2019, the company announced that the Arctic Cat brand would return to its side-by-sides and ATVs beginning with the 2020 model year.

Vehicles today

Snowmobiles

Arctic Cat is known for their M series snowmobile models which were 3rd in Market share behind Ski-doo and Polaris in 2003. This "Skinny Mini" prototype sled had features different from other sleds at that time, by utilizing parts that provided more than one role and a track that had less width than other sleds, reducing rotating mass.   Arctic Cat discovered that this design was suitable for mountain riding, however the trail model developed an overheating issue as the heat exchanges were found to be insufficient when ridden on ice and in marginal snow conditions. Though the majority of sleds experienced no issues, this resulted in a class action lawsuit and resulted in an out of court settlement where Arctic Cat bought back 3,200 short track Firecat F-7's from owners. These sleds featured a lay down type engine which placed the carburetors in front of the engine, which was centered low in the sled to centralize mass and was believed to allow cooler air inlet temperatures.  Big changes were made to the lineup for the 2007 model year as a new chassis was introduced which was called a twin-spar chassis replacing all previous models while adding a new 4 stroke engine, the Z1 Jaguar, which featured an 1056cc 4-stroke parallel twin. In 2009 the Z1 was turbocharged to produce , which was  more than any other production snowmobile. The Crossfire and M-series remain on the same M-series chassis which is a spin off from the original Firecat Chassis.

All-terrain vehicles
Arctic Cat started producing utility all-terrain vehicles in 1996, and expanded to produce side by side UTV's in 2005.  They produce many different models from youth models to competition models, with other models being sport, recreation, 2-Up Trail, and utility models. They also now offer a line of economy mid size utility ATV's which are manufactured by Kymco in Taiwan.  Most models come with both 2-wheel drive and 4-wheel drive, ride in suspensions, and electronic power steering capabilities.

The original design of utility ATVs was offered from 1996 to 2004 and featured single cylinder liquid or air cooled motors from 250 to 500cc's, and all of a common design.  This Arctic Cat-designed motor was manufactured by Suzuki and featured a 2V SOHC design with hemispherical combustion chambers.  Manual and CVT automatic transmissions were offered.  A 650V2 V-twin engine option borrowed from the Kawasaki Prairie was also offered starting in 2003.  A major redesign of the platform was launched in 2005.  With the new redesign came new body work, electronics, rear mounted gas tank and a standard front locking diff, though the chassis in general remained largely unchanged.  A new high performance engine platform also debuted in the 650H1.  This H1 platform was a direct evolution of the previous Suzuki manufactured engines with many parts being interchangeable, but was now manufactured by Arctic Cat in the US.  A 700EFI model was also offered which used an engine and transmission combo borrowed from the Suzuki King Quad model.  This is a 4V dohc design with no relation to the H1 engine platform.  This was replaced with the 700H1 which was a higher displacement version of the 650H1 with fuel injection added. A multi-fuel capable Parallel Twin diesel made by Lombardi Marine was also available in the TRV 700 chassis from 2007-2015, albeit in limited quantities. A 1000cc H2 V-twin engine, was also made available.  Arctic Cat utility ATV's are primarily designed and marketed toward utilitarian uses such as farm work and hunting.  Compared to other ATVs, they offer very high ground clearance, low gear ratios for towing, and large steel racks for hauling large loads, and large fuel tanks for extended range.  The high ground clearance and locking differentials make them particularly adept off road.  They also offer 2 up models, and the TBX model which features a large dump box and high payload capacity, and a Mud Pro model which features factory air snorkels to allow it to drive nearly submerged, larger mud tires, and stronger driveline components.

In 2014, Joshua Newman provided extensive belt testing for the 400cc air cooled model, improving the brand's reliability.

In 2017, Arctic Cat produced its final model year for ATVs after joining Textron with the Alterra continuing under the Textron Off Road brand name. The Arctic Cat brand will return to side-by-side lines in 2019, for model year 2020 vehicles.

Side-by-sides

Arctic Cat offered its first side by side UTV, the Prowler, starting in 2005.  This is a utility model with large rear mounted box similar to a pickup truck bed.  It is mainly intended for utility and farm use.  A new high performance model, the Wildcat was also launched to meet the new demand for recreational UTVs aimed at high speed trail riding which was made popular by the huge success of the Polaris RZR.  Both Prowlers and Wildcats are offered in 2 and 4 seat models with various engine offerings.

In 2015, Arctic Cat launched the Side-By-Side (SXS) Racing Series as a support series to the Stadium Super Trucks; the series fielded ten Wildcat side-by-sides for its debut at the Sand Sports Super Show in Costa Mesa, California.

In 2017, Arctic Cat produced its final model year for UTVs after joining Textron with variations of the Wildcat and Prowler being offered under the Textron Off Road brand name. The Arctic Cat brand will return to side-by-side lines in 2019, for model year 2020 vehicles.

References

External links

 

Tracked vehicles
Snowmobile manufacturers
Vehicle manufacturing companies established in 1960
Motor vehicle manufacturers based in Minnesota
1960 establishments in Minnesota
Thief River Falls, Minnesota
Companies formerly listed on the Nasdaq
2017 mergers and acquisitions
Textron